Joseph Kobina Dadson was an Anglican bishop in Ghana:  he was Bishop of Sunyani-Tamale from 1981 to 1997.

Dadson was born in 1927 and educated at the University of Ghana. He was ordained in 1958 and served in the Diocese of Accra as a Military chaplain. He was Archdeacon of Accra from 1978 to 1981; and Vicar general of Accra from 1980 to 1981.

References

1927 births
University of Ghana alumni
Anglican bishops of Tamale
Anglican bishops of Sunyani
20th-century Anglican bishops in Ghana
Living people